Hideout (stylized as HIDEOUT) is a Japanese manga series written and illustrated by Masasumi Kakizaki. It was serialized in Shogakukan's seinen manga magazine Weekly Big Comic Spirits in 2010, with its chapters collected in a single tankōbon volume.

Plot
On a supposedly idyllic vacation island, Seichi Kirishima and his wife Miki Kirishima are pinned down by a heavy rain somewhere in the island's interior. But this does not deter Seichi, it determined him, his decision is clear: Tonight, he will kill his wife.

Just a year ago, he was a happy man - an aspiring writer, a contented husband, and a father of a young boy... at that time, everything was going well for him. But such happiness came to end. The day his editor put an end to their collaboration, darkness seeped into his life faster than a bullet. A terrifying descent into hell commences, page by page of what it seems to be his last novel...

Characters
 Seichi Kirishima: A former writer and the husband of Miki Kirishima. After losing his son, he brought his wife on a vacation on which he planned on murdering her. 
 Miki Kirishima: Seichi's wife. She is angry at her husband after their only son's death.
 The Old man: He is depraved of sunlight as he lives inside a dark cave for his life, takes women as prisoners and consumes the flesh of male stragglers.

Publication
Hideout is written and illustrated by Masasumi Kakizaki. It was serialized in Shogakukan's seinen manga magazine Weekly Big Comic Spirits from June 14 to August 23, 2010. Shogakukan collected its nine chapters in a single tankōbon volume, released on November 30, 2010.

Chapter list

References

2010 manga
Psychological horror anime and manga
Seinen manga
Shogakukan manga